ToggleKeys is a feature of Microsoft Windows. It is an accessibility function which is designed for people who have vision impairment or cognitive disabilities. When ToggleKeys is turned on, the computer will provide sound cues when the locking keys (or ) are pressed. A high-pitched sound plays when the keys are switched on and a low-pitched sound plays when they are switched off.

History 
Microsoft first introduced ToggleKeys with Windows 95. The feature is also used in later versions of Windows.

Enabling
Press the  key for 5 seconds while holding. This feature can also be turned on and off via the Accessibility icon in the Windows Control Panel or via Windows Settings.

See also 
 FilterKeys
 MouseKeys
 StickyKeys

Computer accessibility
User interface techniques
Ergonomics